Chief Judge of the New York Court of Appeals refers to the position of chief judge on the New York Court of Appeals. They are also known as the Chief Judge of New York.

The chief judge supervises the seven-judge Court of Appeals. In addition, the chief judge oversees the work of the state's Unified Court system, which as of 2009, had a $2.5 billion annual budget and more than 16,000 employees. The chief judge is also a member of the Judicial Conference of the State of New York.

Chief judges before 1870

Chief judges between 1870 and 1974

Chief judges since 1974
After 1974, judges of the New York Court of Appeals were no longer elected, following reforms to the New York Constitution. Instead, an appointment process was created.

See also
List of associate judges of the New York Court of Appeals

References and footnotes

External links
 Rules of the Chief Judge in the New York Codes, Rules and Regulations

New York Court of Appeals A
Justices
New York
1847 establishments in New York (state)